The 2007 Rolex 24 at Daytona was a Grand-Am Rolex Sports Car Series 24-hour endurance sports car race held on January 27–28, 2007 at the Daytona International Speedway road course. The overall winner of the race was the Chip Ganassi/Felix Sabates-owned #01 car, a Lexus-powered Riley MkXI, driven by Juan Pablo Montoya, Salvador Durán, and Scott Pruett. The GT class was won by the #22 Alegra Motorsports/Fiorano Racing Porsche GT3 Cup car driven by driver/owner Carlos de Quesada, Jean-François Dumoulin, Scooter Gabel, and Porsche factory driver Marc Basseng.

Prelude

Race
At the green flag, which fell just past 1:30 p.m. Eastern time, Gurney jumped into the lead and the field made its way around the first lap cleanly. But after only seven laps of the 24-hour race, Gurney crashed into the back of a slower GT car which had lost its hood and unexpectedly slowed dramatically. The team would make repairs, but Gurney's GAINSCO Auto Insurance-sponsored Pontiac-powered Riley, which was co-driven by Jon Fogarty and Jimmy Vasser, would never again be in contention for the win.

On January 28, an early morning wreck of the #82 Porsche GT3 Cup, driven by Chris Pallis, damaged part of the outer retaining wall, causing the race stewards to display the red flag for only the third time in the history of the 24 Hours of Daytona, temporarily suspending the race while repairs took place.
An exciting battle took place between three different teams with a diverse group of drivers. The DP class fight was between eventual winner Telmex Chip Ganassi Racing's Juan Pablo Montoya and Scott Pruett, SunTrust Racing's Max Angelelli and SAMAX Motorsport's Patrick Carpentier. Polesitter Alex Gurney's hopes for victory were dashed when his GAINSCO/Bob Stallings Racing Pontiac Riley was damaged in a first-hour accident.

1,000,000th lap
At 11:11a.m. on the morning of January 28, British-born female Champ Car driver Katherine Legge made history by completing the one millionth lap of the Rolex Daytona 24 hour race, since its inception. Legge, driving the #84 Robinson Racing Pontiac-powered Riley DP car, passed the finish line with less than 2 and a half hours left in the race, completing the 30,419th lap of the 2007 running of the race. Legge was lying in the 31st position at the time.

3 women competed at this years race. Valerie Limoges of Canada, Katherine Legge of Great Britain & Milka Duno of Venezuela.

Juan Pablo Montoya became the first racer in history to have won a Formula One race, the Indianapolis 500, a Champ Car title, and the 24 Hours of Daytona. Mario Andretti also won a Formula One race, a Champ Car title and an endurance sports car race at Daytona, but Andretti's victory came in the 1972 event alongside co-driver Jacky Ickx in a six-hour event.

Race results
Class winners in bold.

References

24 Hours of Daytona
24 Hours of Daytona
24 Hours of Daytona